Holey may refer to:

People with the surname
Jan Udo Holey (born 1967), pen name Jan van Helsing, is a controversial German author who embraces conspiracy theories
Illingworth Holey Kerr (1905–1989), Canadian painter, illustrator and writer
Макс Барских

Other uses
Holey Artisan Bakery, bakery located in Dhaka, Bangladesh
Holey dollar, coins used in the early history of two British settlements: Prince Edward Island and New South Wales
Holey Plains State Park, 10,638-hectare state park in East Gippsland, Victoria, south-eastern Australia

See also
Holey Artisan Bakery attack
Holey building, monument and building in the business district of La Défense and in the commune of Puteaux, to the west of Paris, France
Holey fiber, a type of Photonic-crystal fiber (PCF), a new class of optical fiber based on the properties of photonic crystals
Holeys
Holley (disambiguation)
Holy
Hooley